Buck Ait is an island in the River Thames in Oxfordshire, England. It is on the reach above Shiplake Lock near Sonning.

The island is uninhabited and tree-covered. It lies low, acting as a water-meadow in times of flood, opposite houses with large river frontages. Its shape shows the cumulative effect of the locally curved stream, its erosion and deposition make the upstream end almost joined to the bank; the downstream end, broken into islets.

The island derives its name from the eel bucks or traps that used to be placed here. Late 19th century Thames Conservancy records state they caused considerable hindrance to navigation. Eel bucks were set in St Patrick's Stream on the bank opposite upstream also; perhaps once a tributary of the mouth of the Loddon which became a distributary of a foreshortened Loddon when water levels rose by the building of Shiplake Lock and its heightened weir.

Buck Ait is positioned towards the Oxfordshire bank of the river.

See also
Islands in the River Thames

References

Islands of Berkshire
Islands of the River Thames
Uninhabited islands of England
Borough of Wokingham